University College of Azerabadegan, established in 2006, is a private business school located in Urmia, Iran.

References

Az
Buildings and structures in Urmia
Education in Urmia
Private universities and colleges